Fox Creek is a stream in the U.S. state of South Dakota.

Fox Creek takes its name from nearby Fox Ridge.

See also
List of rivers of South Dakota

References

Rivers of Dewey County, South Dakota
Rivers of South Dakota